The Franchise Affair may refer to:
 The Franchise Affair (novel), a 1948 novel by Josephine Tey
 The Franchise Affair (film),  a 1951 British film, based on the novel
 The Franchise Affair (1962 TV series), a British television series, based on the novel
 The Franchise Affair (1988 TV series), a British television series, based on the novel